Andy Chukwu (born 14 May 1959)  is a Nigerian movie director. He started his career as an actor. Movies he has acted in include Karishika (1996), Witches (1998) and Issakaba (2000). Movies directed by him include Mr. Ibu and 2 Rats. Chukwu has directed movies starring A-list Nollywood actors/actresses such as Osita Iheme, Chinedu Ikedieze, Dakore Egbuson, Patience Ozokwor, Amaechi Muonagor, Julius Agwu, Pete Edochie, Ali Nuhu, Emeka Ike, Gentle Jack, Ronke Ojo, Sandra Achums, amongst others.

He was one of the movie industry stakeholders invited by the president of Nigeria Goodluck Jonathan in 2013 to mark the 20th anniversary since the release of the first Nigerian movie on home video.

Background
Chukwu is from Obinagu in Ishiagu town of Ivo Local Government Area of Ebonyi State.

Career
Chukwu's acting career kicked off when featuring in the Nollywood horror classic Karishika in 1996. After starring in a couple of movies as an actor such as Issakaba and Witches. He transited from acting in the late 90s to movie directing in the 2000s. He has over a dozen movies under his belt in both acting and directing capacities. He sometimes stars in movies he directs, taking on minor supporting roles. He is the director of the Nigerian critically acclaimed comedy Mr. Ibu starring John Okafor as the main character.  Today, John Okafor is more widely known by name of the character he played in this movie than his actual government name.

Community projects
Chukwu partnered with the governments of Ebonyi State  and Lagos State for a skill acquisition program called Street to Skills. The aim was the program was to help children and youth stop street hawking and hone skills which they could use to earn a living.

Chukwu iterated that he is working on a movie to draw awareness to Vesicovaginal fistula (VVF) and the plight faced by its sufferers. He pledged making the movie as part of his contribution to the pet project of the erstwhile first lady of Ebonyi State, Josephine Elechi.

Filmography

Personal life
In 2015, Chukwu lost his father. In May 2016, Chukwu's wife gave birth to a set of twins.

See also
 List of Nigerian film directors
 List of people from Ebonyi State

References

External links

People from Ebonyi State
Nigerian film directors
Nigerian male film actors
Living people

1959 births